Cullie M. Tarleton is a North Carolina businessman and politician raised in Union County, North Carolina. Tarleton graduated from Marshville High School. Tarleton is married to Sylvia Davis Tarleton. He currently lives in Blowing Rock, North Carolina. Tarleton is a retired broadcasting executive and general manager for WBTV, WBT (AM), and WCCB in Charlotte, North Carolina. He is also a veteran of the North Carolina Army National Guard and United States Army Reserve (1956–64). Tarleton is also a 32nd Degree Mason.

Political career
Tarleton represented the 93rd state House of Representatives district (including Ashe and Watauga counties) for two terms, from January 2007 through December 2010. A Democrat, he defeated the longtime Republican incumbent, W. Eugene Wilson, by a 13,414 to 11,069 margin, in November 2006. Tarleton had previously lost to Wilson in November 2004. He was defeated for re-election in 2010 by Republican Jonathan Jordan. After his defeat, Tarleton served on the State Lottery Commission. On February 13, 2012, Tarleton announced he would run again for the District 93 seat.

Electoral history

2010

2008

2006

2004

References

External links

Democratic Party members of the North Carolina House of Representatives
Living people
21st-century American politicians
People from Union County, North Carolina
People from Blowing Rock, North Carolina
Year of birth missing (living people)